José Roberto Lucini (born 31 May 1981), commonly known as Zé Roberto, is a Brazilian football coach and former player who played as a defender. He is the current head coach of São Joseense.

References

External links

1981 births
Living people
Brazilian people of Italian descent
Brazilian footballers
Association football defenders
Esporte Clube Vitória players
Marília Atlético Clube players
Mogi Mirim Esporte Clube players
Pogoń Szczecin players
Liaoning F.C. players
Chinese Super League players
Brazilian expatriate footballers
Brazilian expatriate sportspeople in Poland
Brazilian expatriate sportspeople in China
Expatriate footballers in Poland
Expatriate footballers in China
Brazilian football managers
Luverdense Esporte Clube managers